Ponce is a surname or part of a surname. Notable people with the surname include:

Chilean people
Miguel Ponce (born 1971), Chilean footballer
Waldo Ponce (born 1982), Chilean footballer
Walter Ponce (born 1998), Chilean footballer

Filipino people
Juan Ponce Enrile (born 1924), Filipino politician and senator
Juan Ponce Sumuroy (fl. 1649-1650), Filipino rebel leader
Mariano Ponce (1863–1918), Filipino physician and leader of the Propaganda Movement

Mexican people
Daniel Ponce de León (born 1980), Mexican professional boxer
Edgar Ponce (1974–2005), Mexican actor and dancer
Ernesto Zedillo (in full: Ernesto Zedillo Ponce de León) (born 1951), President of Mexico 1994–2000
Manuel Barbachano Ponce (1924–1994), Mexican film producer, director, screenwriter, and novelist
Manuel Ponce (1882–1948), Mexican composer
 Miguel Ángel Ponce (born 1989), Mexican footballer
Sergio Amaury Ponce (born 1981), Mexican football (soccer) player

Puerto Rican people
Carlos Ponce (born 1972), Puerto Rican actor, singer, and composer
Juan Ponce de Leon II (1524–1591), first Puerto Rican to assume governorship of Puerto Rico
Juan Ponce de León y Loayza, the great-grandson of Spanish conquistador Juan Ponce de Leon and founder of the city of Ponce in Puerto Rico

Spanish people
 Antonio Ponce de Santa Cruz, Spanish cartographer, instrument maker and historian.
 Angela Ponce, first transgender woman in Miss Universe
Juan Ponce de León (1460–1521), Spanish explorer and conquistador of the New World
Luis Ponce de León (1527–1591), Spanish poet and Augustinian friar
Mateo de la Mata Ponce de León ([?]–1720), Spanish colonial officer, interim viceroy of Peru 1716
Pedro Ponce de León (1520–1584), Spanish Benedictine monk, established a school for the deaf

Other people
Cecilia Ludmila Ponce, Argentine actress on Mexican Telenovelas 
Cody Ponce, American baseball player
Dan Ponce, American television journalist
Ezequiel Ponce, Argentine footballer
Phil Ponce, American television journalist
Camilo Ponce Enríquez (politician) (1912–1976), President of Ecuador 1956–1960
Gustavo Ponce (b. 1952), Venezuelan mathematician
Juan Federico Ponce Vaides (1889–1956), Guatemalan politician, acting president 1944
Manuel María Ponce Brousset (1874–1966), President of Peru for two days in 1966
María Ponce de Bianco (1924–1978), Argentine social activist
Ebontius also known as "Poncio", French saint and Bishop of Barbastro

Spanish-language surnames
French-language surnames